Arthur Edward Pepper Jr. (September 1, 1925 – June 15, 1982) was an American alto saxophonist and very occasional tenor saxophonist and clarinetist. Active in West Coast jazz, Pepper came to prominence in Stan Kenton's big band. He was known for his emotionally charged performances and several stylistic shifts throughout his career, and was described by critic Scott Yanow as having "attained his goal of becoming the world's great altoist" at the time of his death.

Early life
Art Pepper was born in Gardena, California, United States. His mother was a 14-year-old runaway; his father, a merchant seaman. Both were violent alcoholics, and when Pepper was still quite young, he was sent to live with his paternal grandmother. He expressed early musical interest and talent, and he was given lessons. He began playing clarinet at nine, switched to alto saxophone at 13, and immediately began jamming on Central Avenue, the black nightclub district of Los Angeles.

Career
At the age of 17, he began playing professionally with Benny Carter and then became part of the Stan Kenton orchestra, touring with that band until he was drafted in 1943. After the war, he returned to Los Angeles, and joined the Kenton Innovations Orchestra. By the 1950s, Pepper was recognized as one of the leading alto saxophonists in jazz, finishing second only to Charlie Parker as Best Alto Saxophonist in the DownBeat magazine Readers Poll of 1952. Along with Chet Baker, Gerry Mulligan, and Shelly Manne, and perhaps due more to geography than playing style, Pepper is often associated with the musical movement known as West Coast jazz, as contrasted with the East Coast (or "hot") jazz of Charlie Parker, Dizzy Gillespie and Miles Davis. Some of Pepper's best known albums from the 1950s are Art Pepper Meets the Rhythm Section, Art Pepper + Eleven – Modern Jazz Classics, Gettin' Together, and Smack Up. Other recordings from this time appear on The Aladdin Recordings (three volumes), The Early Show, The Late Show, Surf Ride, and Art Pepper with Warne Marsh (also issued as The Way It Was!), which features a session recorded with Warne Marsh.

His career was repeatedly interrupted by several prison stints stemming from his addiction to heroin, but Pepper managed to have several productive "comebacks". Remarkably, his substance abuse and legal travails did not affect the quality of his recordings, which maintained a high level of musicianship throughout his career until his death in 1982.

His last comeback saw Pepper, who had started his career in Stan Kenton's big band, becoming a member of Buddy Rich's Big Band from 1968 to 1969. After beginning methadone therapy in the mid-1970s, he toured Europe and Japan with his own groups and recorded many albums, mostly for Galaxy Records, a subsidiary of Fantasy Records., Pepper's later albums include Living Legend, Art Pepper Today, Among Friends, and Live in Japan.

Personal life
Pepper lived for many years in the hills of Echo Park, in Los Angeles. He became a heroin addict in the 1940s, and his career was interrupted by drug-related prison sentences in 1954–56, 1960–61, 1961–64, and 1964–65; the final two sentences were served in San Quentin. While in San Quentin, he played in an ensemble with saxophonist Frank Morgan. In the late 1960s, Pepper spent time in Synanon, a rehabilitation program that turned out to be a cult.

His autobiography, Straight Life (1980, co-written with his third wife Laurie Pepper), discusses the jazz music world, as well as drug and criminal subcultures of mid-20th century California. Among the many anecdotes shared from his life, Pepper boasts of raping a woman while stationed in London during the Second World War (deserved, in his view, because he had shared whiskey and walked several miles with her). Soon after the publication of this book, director Don McGlynn released the documentary film Art Pepper: Notes from a Jazz Survivor, discussing his life and featuring interviews with both Art and his wife Laurie, as well as footage from a live performance in a Malibu jazz club. Laurie Pepper also released an interview to NPR.

Pepper died of a stroke in Los Angeles on June 15, 1982, aged 56. He is interred in the Abbey of the Psalms Mausoleum in the Hollywood Forever Cemetery, Hollywood.

Discography

As leader 
 Surf Ride (Savoy, 1956) – recorded in 1952–54
 Two Altos with Sonny Red (Regent, 1959) – recorded in 1952–54
 The Return of Art Pepper with Jack Sheldon (Jazz West, 1956)
 Playboys with Chet Baker and Phil Urso (Pacific Jazz, 1956) – reissued as Picture of Heath
 The Art Pepper Quartet (Tampa, 1957) – recorded in 1956
 Collections with Red Norvo, Joe Morello and Gerry Wiggins (Intro, 1957)
 Modern Art (Intro, 1957) – recorded in 1956-57
 Art Pepper Meets the Rhythm Section (Contemporary, 1957)
 Art Pepper + Eleven – Modern Jazz Classics (Contemporary, 1959)
 Gettin' Together with Conte Candoli (Contemporary, 1960)
 Smack Up with Jack Sheldon (Contemporary, 1960)
 Intensity (Contemporary, 1963) – recorded in 1960
 Art Pepper Quartet in San Francisco (Fresh Sound, 1964) – live
 Art Pepper Quintet : Live at Donte's 1968 with Joe Romano (Fresh Sound, 1968) – live
 The Art of Pepper (Onyx, 1974) – recorded in 1957
 Garden State Jam Sessions Bootleg (Lone Hill Jazz, 1975) – live
 I'll Remember April : Live at Foothill College (Storyville, 1975)
 Living Legend (Contemporary, 1975)
 The Trip (Contemporary, 1976)
 A Night in Tunisia (Storyville, 1977) – live
 Tokyo Debut (Galaxy, 1977) – live. also released as First Live in Japan.
 No Limit (Contemporary, 1977)
 Thursday Night at the Village Vanguard (Contemporary, 1977) – live
 Friday Night at the Village Vanguard (Contemporary, 1977) – live
 Saturday Night at the Village Vanguard (Contemporary, 1977) – live
 More for Les at the Village Vanguard (Contemporary, 1977) – live
 Live in Japan, Vol. 1: Ophelia (Storyville, 1978)
 Live in Japan, Vol. 2 (Storyville, 1978)
 Among Friends (Interplay, 1978)
 Art Pepper Today (Galaxy, 1978)
 Landscape (Galaxy, 1979) – live
 Besame Mucho (Galaxy, 1979) – live
 Straight Life (Galaxy, 1979)
 So in Love (Artists House, 1980) – recorded in 1979
 One September Afternoon (Galaxy, 1980)
 Winter Moon with Howard Roberts (Galaxy, 1981) – recorded in 1980
 Roadgame (Galaxy, 1982) – live recorded in 1981
 Goin' Home with George Cables (Galaxy, 1982)
 Darn That Dream (Real Time, 1982)
 Art Lives (Galaxy, 1983) – live recorded in 1981
 Tête-à-Tête with George Cables (Galaxy, 1983) – recorded in 1982
 Artworks (Galaxy, 1984) – recorded in 1979
 APQ (Galaxy, 1984) – live recorded in 1981
 New York Album (Galaxy, 1985) – recorded in 1979
 Stardust (Victor (Japan), 1985) – recorded in 1979
 Art Pepper with Warne Marsh (Contemporary, 1986) – recorded in 1956. reissued tracks from The Way It Was! (1972).
 Tokyo Encore (Dreyfus, 1991) – live recorded in 1979
 Arthur's Blues (Galaxy, 1991) – live recorded in 1981
 Art in L.A. (WestWind, 1991)[2CD] – recorded in 1957-60
 Live in Japan: The Summer Knows (Absord (Japan), 1994) – live
 Art 'n' Zoot with Zoot Sims (Pablo, 1995) – live recorded in 1981
 Art Pepper with Duke Jordan in Copenhagen 1981 with Duke Jordan (Galaxy, 1996) – live recorded in 1981
 San Francisco Samba (Contemporary, 1997) – live recorded in 1977
 Unreleased Art, Vol. 1–10 (Widow's Taste, 2006- )

As sideman 

With Chet Baker
 The Route with Richie Kamuca (Pacific Jazz, 1956)
 Chet Baker Big Band (Pacific Jazz, 1956)

With Toni Harper
 Lady Lonely (RCA, 1959)
 Night Mood (RCA, 1960)

With Stan Kenton
 Stan Kenton's Milestones (Capitol, 1950) – recorded in 1943–47
 Stan Kenton Classics (Capitol, 1952) – recorded in 1944–47
 Encores (Capitol, 1947)
 A Presentation of Progressive Jazz (Capitol, 1947)
 Innovations in Modern Music (Capitol, 1950)
 Stan Kenton Presents (Capitol, 1950)
 Popular Favorites by Stan Kenton (Capitol, 1953)
 This Modern World (Capitol, 1953)
 The Kenton Era (Capitol, 1955) – recorded in 1940–54
 The Innovations Orchestra (Capitol, 1997) – recorded in 1950–51

With Milcho Leviev
 Blues for the Fisherman (Mole, 1980) – live
 True Blues (Mole, 1980) – live

With Shorty Rogers
 Modern Sounds (Capitol, 1952)[10"] – recorded in 1951
 Shorty Rogers and His Giants (RCA Victor, 1953)[10"]
 Cool and Crazy (RCA Victor, 1953)[10"]
 The Swingin' Nutcracker (RCA Victor, 1960)
 Popo (Xanadu, 1980) – recorded in 1951

With others
 Jesse Belvin, Mr. Easy (RCA, 1960) – recorded in 1959
 Hoagy Carmichael, Hoagy Sings Carmichael (Pacific Jazz, 1957) – recorded in 1956
 Dolo Coker, California Hard with Blue Mitchell (Xanadu, 1977) – recorded in 1976
 Richie Cole, Return to Alto Acres (Palo Alto, 1982)
 Conte Candoli, Mucho Calor with Bill Perkins, Russ Freeman, Ben Tucker, Chuck Flores, Jack Costanzo and Mike Pacheko (Andex/VSOP, 1957)
 Herb Ellis and Jimmy Giuffre, Herb Ellis Meets Jimmy Giuffre (Verve, 1959)
 Art Farmer, On the Road (Contemporary, 1976)
 Jerry Fielding, The Gauntlet (Warner Bros., 1978) – Soundtrack recorded in 1977
 Johnny Griffin, Birds and Ballads (Galaxy, 1978)
 Freddie Hubbard, Mistral (East World, 1981) – recorded in 1980
 Elvin Jones, Very R.A.R.E. (Trio (Japan), 1980) – recorded in 1979
 Barney Kessel, Some Like It Hot (Contemporary, 1959)
 Shelly Manne, The West Coast Sound (Contemporary, 1956) – recorded in 1953-55
 Jack Nitzsche, Heart Beat (Capitol, 1980) – Soundtrack
 Anita O'Day, Cool Heat (Verve, 1959)
 Marty Paich, The Marty Paich Quartet featuring Art Pepper (Tampa/VSOP, 1956)
 André Previn, The Subterraneans (MGM, 1960) – soundtrack
 Buddy Rich Big Band, Mercy, Mercy (Pacific Jazz, 1968) – live

Transcriptions
Published transcriptions:
 Jazz Styles and Analysis: Alto Sax by Harry Miedema. Chicago, Fifth Printing, February 1979. Includes Broadway.
 Straight Life: the Story of Art Pepper by Art Pepper and Laurie Pepper. New York and London, 1979. . Includes the head of Straight Life.
 Jazz 2: Sax Alto. Transcribed by John Robert Brown. International Music Publications, Woodford Green, Essex, 1986. . Includes Round Midnight.
 The Genius of Art Pepper. Foreword by Laurie Pepper. North Sydney, Warner/Chappell Music, 1987. . Includes: Arthur's Blues; Blues for Blanche; Funny Blues; Landscape; Make a List Make a Wish; Mambo de la Pinta; Mambo Koyama; Mr Big Falls his J.G. Hand; Our Song; Road Game; September Song; Tete a Tete. All transcriptions include parts for Alto and Rhythm; Funny Blues also has a part for Trumpet.
 Masters of the Alto Saxophone Play The Blues. Jazz Alto Solos. Transcribed by Trent Kynaston and Jonathan Ball. Corybant Productions, 1990. Includes True Blues.
 The Art Pepper Collection. Foreword by Jeff Sultanof. Milwaukee, Hal Leonard, 1995. . Includes: Art's Oregano; Diane; Landscape; Las Cuevas de Mario; Make a List (Make a Wish); Mr. Big Falls his J.G. Hand; Ophelia; Pepper Returns; Sometime; Straight Life; Surf Ride(I); Surf Ride(II); That's Love; The Trip; Waltz Me Blues.
 West Coast Jazz Saxophone Solos transcribed and edited by Robert A. Luckey, Ph.D. Features 15 recorded solos from 1952 to 1961, including five solos by Art Pepper. Olympia Music Publishing, 1996. .

Transcriptions available on the Internet:
 Anthropology
 Birk's Works
 Groovin' High
 Red Pepper Blues
 Star Eyes
 The Way You Look Tonight
 Too Close For Comfort
 What Is This Thing Called Love?
 You'd Be So Nice To Come Home To

Bibliography
A more extensive bibliography is issued by the Jazzinstitut Darmstadt
1956 Art Pepper... Tells the Tragic Role Narcotics Played in Blighting His Career and Life by John Tynan. Downbeat, September 19, 1956, p. 16.
1957 Art Pepper Quartet by John Tynan. Downbeat, May 16, 1957, p. 34.
1960 Art Pepper: Profile of a Comeback by J. McKinney. Metronome, lxxvii, September 1960, p. 26.
1960 The Return of Art Pepper by John Tynan. Downbeat, xxvii/8, 1960, p. 17.
1960 End of the Road by John Tynan. Downbeat, xxvii/25, 1960, p. 13.
1964 Art Pepper's not the Same by John Tynan. Downbeat, xxxi/22, 1964, p. 18.
1965 "Jazz Discographies Unlimited" Presents "Art Pepper". A Complete Discography Compiled by Ernie Edwards, Jr. Ernie Edwards Jr. et al. Jazz Discographies Unlimited, Spotlight Series, Vol. 4. Oct . 1965. 22pp.
1973 Art Pepper: 'I'm Here to Stay! by C. Marra. Downbeat, xl/4, 1973, p. 16.
1975 Pepper's Painful Road to Pure Art by L. Underwood. Downbeat, xlii/11, 1975, p. 16.
1979 Straight Life: the Story of Art Pepper by Art Pepper and Laurie Pepper. New York and London, 1979. . Includes a discography.
1979 Art Pepper: Rewards of the Straight Life by P. Welding. Downbeat, xlvi/18, 1979, p. 16.
1979 The Contemporary Art of Pepper by Chris Sheridan. Jazz Journal International, Vol. 32, No. 9, September 1979, p. 9.
1979 The evolution of an individualist; Interview with Les Tomkins.
1980 Art Pepper. Swing Journal, xxxiv/1, 1980, p. 162.
1980 At Ronnie's; Interview with Les Tomkins.
1980 A rich past, and a bright future; Interview with Les Tomkins.
1981 New Fields Still to Conquer; Interview with Les Tomkins.
1981 The Whiteness of the Wail by Gary Giddins, in Riding on a Blue Note. New York, O.U.P., 1981, pp. 252–257. (An article originally published in July 1977.)
1986 Art Pepper: I Want to Play so Bad by David Nicholson Pepperell. Wire Magazine, Issue 28, June 1986, pp. 26–31.
1986 Art Pepper, 1926-1982 by Gary Giddins, in Rhythm-a-ning: Jazz Tradition and Innovation in the 80s. New York, O.U.P., 1986, pp. 106–108. (An article originally published in June 1982.)
1992 Straight Life by Ted Gioia, in West Coast Jazz: Modern Jazz in California, 1945-1960. New York and Oxford, O.U.P., 1992, pp. 283–307 (Chapter Fourteen). .
2000 The Art Pepper Companion: Writings on a Jazz Original by Todd Selbert. Cooper Square Press, 2000. .
2014* ART: Why I Stuck with a Junkie Jazzman" by Laurie Pepper. Arthur Pepper Music Corporation 
2014* The Tale of the Tape by Lili Anolik. Harper's Magazine

References

External links

 Straight Life – The Stories of Art Pepper
 The Art Pepper Discography Project
 
 NPR Interview With Laurie Pepper
 [ Allmusic]
 Robert Pinsky's poem "The Hearts" (1990) contains a reference to Art Pepper and Straight Life
 10 Great Albums From the Alto Saxophone Legend
 

Cool jazz saxophonists
Jazz alto saxophonists
West Coast jazz saxophonists
Mainstream jazz saxophonists
Bebop saxophonists
Post-bop saxophonists
Hard bop saxophonists
American jazz alto saxophonists
American male saxophonists
Jazz musicians from California
1925 births
1982 deaths
People from Echo Park, Los Angeles
People from Gardena, California
People from San Pedro, Los Angeles
Burials at Hollywood Forever Cemetery
American people of Italian descent
Savoy Records artists
Galaxy Records artists
Xanadu Records artists
Contemporary Records artists
Fantasy Records artists
20th-century American saxophonists
20th-century American male musicians
American male jazz musicians
Earle Spencer Orchestra members
Discovery Records artists